Republic Street, historically known as Strada Reale or Kingsway, is a principal street in the capital city of Valletta, Malta. It is about 1 kilometer long (0.6 miles) and is known for legislative, judiciary and commercial purposes. It is mostly pedestrianised.

Republic Street extends from City Gate towards the granaries at Fort St. Elmo.
In its downward course the main street runs perpendicular with several other streets given Valletta's grid layout. It also encounters several buildings and squares of note, such as City Gate, Freedom Square, the Parliament of Malta, Palazzo Ferreria, Royal Opera House, the Archaeology Museum, St. John's Square, the Courts of Justice, the Casino Maltese, Republic Square, Grandmaster's Palace, St. George's Square, Spinola Palace, The Malta Chamber of Commerce, Enterprise and Industry, Casa Rocca Piccola and others.

The street is managed by the Valletta Local Council as well as the Maltese government, including waste management.
The street is mostly dedicated to pedestrians, with highly limited vehicle use – only commercial vehicles to load and unload on early morning are allowed. This also applies to general maintenance vehicles. Only karozzini and electric cabs are allowed to drive up and down the street, while taxis can cross at intersections.
The Malta Police Force uses Segways to patrol the streets.

History

After the Great Siege of Malta, Valletta was planned and built on a grid's layout by the Order of St. John, with Republic Street (back then, Strada San Giorgio) in the midst, to become the main street of the city.

The street has had several different names over the course of history. During the Order of St. John it was known Strada San Giorgio, during the French occupation of Malta it was named Rue Nationale, during the Crown Colony of Malta it was named Strada Reale; and during the period of the further Anglicisation of Malta under Prime Minister Sir Gerald Strickland, the street was named Kingsway in 1936. The Maltese renamed the street to its current name.

Republic Street was bombed heavily in World War II and suffered much damage like the rest of the region. This was due to its location in the heart of one of the most important cities in Malta.

In the contemporary day, Valletta is a hub of political, legislative, judiciary, commercial, business, retail and social reasons, such as fashion and music. It becomes busy during the Christmas period.

See also
Republic Square
Valletta
Malta

References

Roads in Malta
Geography of Valletta